Asopos de Vliet is a student rowing club based in Leiderdorp, Netherlands. It takes its membership primarily from Leiden University.

The female-only rowing club De Vliet was founded in 1905, taking its name after one of the waters in Leiden. In 1974 it merged with the male-only rowing club Asopos, named after the Greek river god Asopos). Asopos had been founded in 1962 by discontent members of the club Njord, nowadays a daughter association of Leiden's traditional fraternity/sorority (corps) Minerva.

Trivia
Princess Beatrix of the Netherlands was a member of De Vliet when she studied in Leiden (1956 - 1961).

External links
 Official home page

Student societies in the Netherlands
Rowing clubs in the Netherlands
Sports clubs in South Holland
1974 establishments in the Netherlands
Sport in Leiderdorp